The Georgia Rugby League is the governing body for the sport of rugby league football in Georgia. The Association was formed during 2004.

See also

 Rugby league in Georgia
 Georgia national rugby league team

References

External links

Rugby league in Georgia (country)
Rugby League
Rugby league governing bodies in Europe
Sports organizations established in 2004